The Lover may refer to:

Film and television
The Lover (1986 film), an Israeli film based on the A. B. Yehoshua novel (see below)
The Lover (1992 film), a film based on the Marguerite Duras novel (see below)
The Lover (2002 film), a Russian film directed by Valery Todorovsky
The Lover (2016 film), an American film directed by Mahmoud Shoolizadeh
The Lover (TV series), a 2015 South Korean television series
"The Lover" (The Office), a 2009 television episode

Literature
The Lover (play), a 1962 play by Harold Pinter
The Lover (Duras novel), a 1984 novel by Marguerite Duras
The Lover (Wilson novel), a 2004 novel by Laura Wilson
The Lover (Yehoshua novel), a 1977 novel by A. B. Yehoshua

Music
The Lover (Sibelius) or Rakastava, Op. 14, a 1912 suite by Jean Sibelius

See also
The Lovers (disambiguation)
Lover (disambiguation)